Clinical Ovarian Cancer & Other Gynecologic Malignancies was a peer-reviewed medical journal published by Elsevier. It covered research on the detection, diagnosis, prevention, and treatment of ovarian cancer. Specific areas of interest included clinical research and mechanistic approaches, drug sensitivity and resistance, gene and antisense therapy, pathology, markers, and prognostic indicators, chemoprevention strategies, multimodality therapy, and integration of various approaches. It was replaced by Clinical Ovarian and other Gynecologic Cancer, which was discontinued in 2016.

Abstracting and indexing 
The journal was abstracted and indexed in CINAHL, EMBASE,  and Chemical Abstracts.

Article types 
The journal published editorials, original research papers, reviews, current treatment reports, case reports, brief communications, current trials, translational medicine pieces, and a "Meeting Highlights" section.

References

External links 
 

Oncology journals
Gynaecological cancer
Publications established in 2008
English-language journals
Biannual journals
Elsevier academic journals